Argyrotaenia vinalesiae is a species of moth of the family Tortricidae. It is found in Cuba.

The wingspan is about 10 mm. The ground colour of the forewings is pale cinnamon with darker strigulation (fine streaks) and brownish markings. The hindwings are pale brownish grey.

Etymology
The species name refers to Pinar Rio Vinales, the type locality.

References

V
Endemic fauna of Cuba
Moths of Cuba
Moths described in 2010